The Octonia Stone, also known as Octoney, Octeny, Octona, and Octuna Stone, is a historic boundary marker located near Stanardsville, Greene County, Virginia.  The stone marks the terminus of the westernmost boundary line of the 24,000-acre Octonia Grant.  It is a granite-type rock which is part of a natural outcropping in a hayfield.  The stone is engraved with a figure 8, composed of two, nearly perfect circles, with a cross touching the top of the 8.

Correct coordinates are: (38.3337176, -78.4536142) - msw 11Nov2021

It was listed on the National Register of Historic Places in 1970.

References

Monuments and memorials on the National Register of Historic Places in Virginia
National Register of Historic Places in Greene County, Virginia
Boundary markers